Raphael Patai (Hebrew רפאל פטאי; November 22, 1910 − July 20, 1996), born Ervin György Patai, was a Hungarian-Jewish ethnographer, historian, Orientalist and anthropologist.

Family background
Patai's mother was born in Nagyvárad to German-speaking, Jewish parents who expressed their commitment to Magyar nationalism by sending their daughter to Hungarian-language schools. Both parents spoke Hungarian and German fluently and educated their children to be perfectly fluent in both Hungarian and German. His father was a prominent literary figure, author of numerous Zionist and other writings, including a biography of Theodor Herzl. József was founder and editor of the Jewish political and cultural journal Mult és jövő, (Past and Future) from 1911 to 1944, a journal that was revived in 1988 by János Köbányai in Budapest. József Patai also wrote an early History of Hungarian Jews and founded a Zionist organization in Hungary that procured support for the settlement of Jews in the British Mandate of Palestine.

Education
Raphael Patai studied at rabbinical seminaries in and at the University of Budapest and the University of Breslau, from which he received a doctorate in Semitic languages and Oriental history. He moved to Palestine in 1933, where his parents joined him in 1939, after he received the first doctorate awarded by the Hebrew University of Jerusalem, in 1936. He returned briefly to Budapest, where he completed his ordination at the Budapest Rabbinical Seminary.

Career
During the late 1930s and early 1940s Patai taught at the Hebrew University and served as the secretary of the Haifa Technion. He founded the Palestine Institute of Folklore and Ethnology in 1944, serving as its director of research for four years. He also served as scientific director of a Jewish folklore studies program for the Beit Ha'Am public cultural program in Jerusalem.

In 1947 Patai went to New York with a fellowship from the Viking Fund for Anthropological Research (later renamed the Wenner-Gren Foundation for Anthropological Research); he also studied the Jews of Mexico. Patai settled in the United States, becoming a naturalized citizen in 1952. He held visiting professorships at a number of the country's most prestigious colleges, including Columbia, the University of Pennsylvania, New York University, Princeton, and Ohio State. He held full professorships of anthropology at Dropsie College from 1948 to 1957 and Fairleigh Dickinson University. In 1952 he was asked by the United Nations to direct a research project on Syria, Lebanon and Jordan for the Human Relations Area Files.

Patai's work was wide-ranging but focused primarily on the cultural development of the ancient Hebrews and Israelites, on Jewish history and culture, and on the anthropology of the Middle East generally. He was the author of hundreds of scholarly articles and several dozen books, including three autobiographical volumes. In 1985 he was a contributor to an exhibit at the Museum of New Mexico.

Awards
In 1936, Patai was the co-recipient (jointly with Moshe Zvi Segal) of the Bialik Prize for Jewish thought.

In 1976, Patai was awarded the National Jewish Book Award in the Jewish History category for The Myth of the Jewish Race

Personal life
Patai married Naomi Tolkowsky, whose family had moved to what was then Palestine in the early twentieth century; they had two daughters, Jennifer (born 1942) and Daphne (born 1943).
He died in 1996 in Tucson, Arizona, at the age of 85.
Longtime Hebrew University of Jerusalem organic chemistry professor Saul Patai (1918-1998) was his brother.

Selected bibliography

Own writings 

 (with Emanuel S. Goldsmith)

 (with Jennifer Patai)

 Reprint with an introduction by Merlin Stone

Co-authorship

Autobiography

Secondary sources

See also
Copper Green
List of Bialik Prize recipients

References

External links
The Raphael Patai Papers at the  New York Public Library
Raphael Patai Prize
Raphael Patai Series in Jewish Folklore and Anthropology (Wayne State University Press)

1910 births
1996 deaths
Jewish historians
20th-century Hungarian historians
Hungarian anthropologists
American Zionists
Jewish orientalists
Hungarian orientalists
Hungarian Zionists
American orientalists
Academic staff of the Hebrew University of Jerusalem
Fairleigh Dickinson University faculty
Hebrew University of Jerusalem alumni
University of Breslau alumni
Eötvös Loránd University alumni
Hungarian Jews
Hungarian emigrants to Israel
Jews in Mandatory Palestine
Israeli emigrants to the United States
American people of Hungarian-Jewish descent
Writers from Budapest
20th-century American historians
20th-century American male writers
Jewish scholars of Islam
20th-century American anthropologists
American male non-fiction writers
Palestine ethnographers